Excel Group Institutions (EGI) is an Indian educational institution, established in 2006 by the Sri Rengaswamy Educational Trust (SRET) in Pallakkapalayam, Komarapalayam, Namakkal, Tamil Nadu. It is affiliated with Anna University, and has 11 separate colleges and institutes.

The Excel campus extends over 100 acres, and is situated in the western part of Sankari, near Komarapalayam. 20 km from Erode, 45 km from Salem and 105 km from Coimbatore on NH47.

History
The Sri Rengaswamy Educational Trust (SRET) was established in 2001, with Professor A.K. Natesan as Honorary Chair, Mrs. N. Parvathy as Managing Trustee, and Dr. N. Mathan Karthick as Vice-Chair.

The EGI began teaching in 2006 with the opening of the Excel College of Education and four teacher training institutes. These were soon joined by another education college, the Kandhaswamy College of Education.

In 2007, SRET opened the Excel Engineering College on the campus at Pallakapalayam. In 2008, this was followed by the Excel College of Technology, Excel Business School and Excel Polytechnic College. The Excel College of Engineering and Technology and Excel College of Architecture and Planning opened in 2009.

List of Excel Group Institutions

 Excel Engineering College (established 2007)
 Excel College of Engineering and Technology (2009)
 Excel College of Architecture and Planning (2009)
 Excel Business School (2008)
 Excel Polytechnic College (2008)
 Excel College of Education (2006)
 Excel College of Pharmacy
 Excel College of Physiotherapy and Research Centre
 Excel Institute of Health Science
 Excel Medical College for Naturopathy and Yoga
 Excel College for Commerce and Science

References 

 
 

Colleges affiliated to Anna University
Educational institutions established in 2006
2006 establishments in Tamil Nadu
Education in Namakkal district